WEC 47: Bowles vs. Cruz was a mixed martial arts event held by World Extreme Cagefighting on March 6, 2010.  It was held at the Nationwide Arena in Columbus, Ohio

Background
The only WEC event held in Ohio, WEC 47 coincided with the Arnold Sports Festival, which annually draws up to 150,000 sports fans to Columbus, Ohio. Previously, the UFC held three cards – UFC 68, UFC 82 and UFC 96 – in Columbus during this festival.

Diego Nunes was originally slated to face Leonard Garcia at this event, but was forced from the card with an injury. Nunes was later replaced by George Roop.

Bryan Caraway was expected to face Fredson Paixao at this event, but was replaced by Courtney Buck after injuring his knee. The Paixao/Caraway bout was rescheduled for WEC 50 that August, where Paixao won via split decision.

Stephan Bonnar filled in for Frank Mir as color commentator, due to training commitments for Mir. Bonnar was named as the promotion's final permanent color commentator shortly afterwards.

This was the last WEC event to feature announcer Joe Martinez as the regular ring announcer, due to family reasons and to focus full-time on his work with Golden Boy Promotions. Martinez later made a one-off return at WEC 52, as his replacement Bruce Buffer was in Germany to announce UFC 122.

The event drew an estimated 373,000 viewers on Versus.

Results

Bonus Awards
Fighters were awarded $10,000 bonuses.
Fight of the Night:  Leonard Garcia vs.  George Roop
Knockout of the Night:  Anthony Pettis
Submission of the Night:  Joseph Benavidez

Reported payout 
The following is the reported payout to the fighters as reported to the Ohio Athletic Commission. It does not include sponsor money or "locker room" bonuses often given by the WEC and also do not include the WEC's traditional "fight night" bonuses.

Dominick Cruz: $18,000 (includes $9,000 win bonus) def. Brian Bowles: $12,000
Joseph Benavidez: $29,000 ($14,500 win bonus) def. Miguel Torres: $26,000
Javier Vazquez: $12,000 ($6,000 win bonus) def. Jens Pulver: $14,000
LC Davis: $18,000 ($9,000 win bonus) def. Deividas Taurosevičius: $9,000
Bart Palaszewski: $12,000 ($6,000 win bonus) def. Karen Darabedyan: $4,000
Scott Jorgensen: $16,000 ($8,000 win bonus) def. Chad George: $3,000
Chad Mendes: $8,000 ($4,000 win bonus) def. Erik Koch: $3,000
Anthony Pettis: $6,000 ($3,000 win bonus) def. Danny Castillo: $9,500
Leonard Garcia: $14,000 vs. George Roop: $3,000 ^
Fredson Paixao: $4,000 ($2,000 win bonus) def. Courtney Buck: $3,000
Ricardo Lamas: $10,000 ($5,000 win bonus) def. Bendy Casimir $3,000

^ Both fighters earned show money; bout declared split draw.

See also
 World Extreme Cagefighting
 List of World Extreme Cagefighting champions
 List of WEC events
 2010 in WEC

External links
Official WEC website

References

World Extreme Cagefighting events
Events in Columbus, Ohio
2010 in mixed martial arts
Mixed martial arts in Ohio
Sports competitions in Columbus, Ohio
2010 in sports in Ohio